Manubhai  is an Indian masculine given name. It may refer to

 Manubhai Kotadia, Indian politician.
 Manubhai Mehta, Dewan of Baroda state.
 Manubhai Pancholi, Gujarati language novelist, author and educationist.
 Manubhai Shah, Indian politician